V. C. Gunathilake PC was the 31st Solicitor General of Sri Lanka. He was appointed on 1977, succeeding Elanga Wikramanayake, and held the office until 1981. He was succeeded by K. M. M. B. Kulatunga.
He received his education at Nalanda College Colombo.

References

Solicitors General of Sri Lanka
Sinhalese lawyers
Sri Lankan Buddhists
President's Counsels (Sri Lanka)
Alumni of Nalanda College, Colombo